IndigoVision is an IP video surveillance systems company based in Edinburgh, Scotland, founded in 1994.

Originally developing generic Internet Protocol video technology under the VideoBridge brand, it later specialised in the video surveillance market. In 2000, it was floated as a public limited company on the London Stock Exchange.

More recently, it has focused on large-scale IP video security systems. Products include Video Management Software, IP cameras and Network Video Recorders. Notable installations include EuroTunnel, Amsterdam Airport Schiphol, Indira Gandhi International Airport Terminal 3 and the Canada–US border.

, IndigoVision has sales and support staff across 30 countries. It provides support from 15 regional centers including New Jersey, São Paulo, Singapore, Dubai, London and Edinburgh, with training facilities, demo suites and local stocking. It partners with approximately 500 trained system integrators to provide local installation and service to end users all over the world.

In March 2020, Motorola Solutions announced that it would acquire the company for £30.4 million. The acquisition was completed in June 2020.

Products
IndigoVision relabels cameras manufactured by Avigilon, also a Motorola Solutions company. The company, which formerly relabeled cameras manufactured by Dahua Technology, told IPVM that the change was made due to NDAA and supply-chain concerns.

References

External links
Official website

Technology companies of the United Kingdom
Companies based in Midlothian
British companies established in 1994
Video surveillance
Video surveillance companies
1994 establishments in Scotland
Scottish brands